Kilbroney is a civil parish in County Down, Northern Ireland. It is situated mainly in the historic barony of Iveagh Upper, Upper Half, with one townland in Iveagh Upper, Lower Half. It is also a townland of 575 acres.

Settlements
The civil parish contains the following settlements:
Rostrevor

Townlands
Kilbroney civil parish contains the following townlands:

Ballincurry
Ballincurry Upper
Ballindoalty
Ballindoalty Upper
Ballinran
Ballinran Upper
Ballintur
Ballintur Upper
Ballyagholy
Ballyedmond
Ballyedmond Upper
Ballymoney
Ballyneddan
Ballyneddan Upper
Drumreagh
Drumreagh Upper
Drumsesk
Kilbroney
Kilroney Upper
Kilfeaghan
Kilfeaghan Upper
Killowen Mountains
Knockbarragh
Levallyclanone
Levallyreagh
Moygannon
Newtown
Newtown Upper
Rosstrevor
Rosstrevor Mountains
Rosstrevor Upper
Tamnyveagh
The Point Park

See also
List of civil parishes of County Down
Kilbroney Park

References

 
Townlands of County Down